Smarty may refer to:

 Smarty (template engine), web template system
 SMARTY, UK virtual mobile phone operator
 Smarty (film), a 1934 comedy film, known as Hit Me Again in the UK
 Funny Face (musical), a 1927 Broadway musical originally called Smarty

See also
 Smarties (disambiguation)